Selma Blair Beitner (born June 23, 1972) is an American actress. She played a number of roles in films and on television before obtaining recognition for her leading role in the film Brown's Requiem (1998). Her breakthrough came when she starred as Zoe Bean on the WB sitcom Zoe, Duncan, Jack and Jane (1999–2000), and as Cecile Caldwell in the cult film Cruel Intentions (1999). She continued to find success with the comedies Legally Blonde (2001) and The Sweetest Thing (2002), and achieved international fame with her portrayal of Liz Sherman in the big-budget fantasy films Hellboy (2004) and Hellboy II: The Golden Army (2008).

Her other notable film credits include Storytelling (2001), A Guy Thing (2003), A Dirty Shame (2004), The Fog (2005), WΔZ (2007), Feast of Love (2007), The Poker House (2008), Dark Horse (2011), In Their Skin (2012), Ordinary World (2016), Mothers and Daughters (2016), Mom and Dad (2017), After (2019) and A Dark Foe (2020).

On television, she starred as Kim in the American remake of Kath & Kim (2008–2009); as Kate Wales on the sitcom Anger Management (2012–2014); and as Kris Jenner in the first season of the FX drama series American Crime Story (2016). In 2010, Blair narrated the audiobook The Diary of Anne Frank, earning a nomination for the Grammy Award for Best Spoken Word Album for Children.

Early life
Blair was born on June 23, 1972, in Southfield, Michigan, a suburb of Detroit. She is the youngest of four daughters of Judge Molly Ann (née Cooke) and Elliot I. Beitner. Her father was an attorney, active in the U.S. Democratic Party, and labor arbitrator until his death in 2012 at the age of 82. Her parents divorced when Blair was 23; she subsequently legally changed her surname. She has three older sisters, Katherine, Elizabeth, and Marie Beitner.

Her father and maternal grandfather were from Jewish families, while her maternal grandmother, who had Scottish ancestry, was Anglican. Blair formally converted to Judaism as a child, and had a Jewish upbringing; her Hebrew name is Bat-Sheva. Blair attended Hillel Day School, a Jewish day school in Farmington Hills and Cranbrook Kingswood in Bloomfield Hills soon after. She spent her freshman year (1990–1991) at Kalamazoo College, where she studied photography and acted in the play The Little Theater of the Green Goose. At the time, she wanted to be a ballerina and a horse trainer.

At the age of 20 she moved to New York City, where she lived at The Salvation Army. She attended New York University (NYU), as well as acting classes at the Stella Adler Conservatory, the Column Theatre, and the Stonestreet Screen Acting Workshop. Later, she returned to Michigan to finish her studies.
After transferring from NYU, she graduated magna cum laude from the University of Michigan in 1994 with a triple major in photography, psychology, and English.

She then returned to New York City to pursue a career in the arts.

Career

1990–1998: Career beginnings
In 1990, during her time at Cranbrook Kingswood, Blair was involved in a production of T.S. Eliot’s Murder in the Cathedral. She considered it a failure, but her English teacher told her not to give up; that was the first time she thought she could be an actress.
In 1993, she began training at acting schools in New York. An agent discovered her in an acting class, and Blair subsequently signed with her. After 75 auditions, Blair got her first advertising contract for a television spot ad for a theater in Virginia,
for which she received her Screen Actor's Guild membership.

Blair began auditioning in the mid-1990s. Her first audition was for a cereal commercial. She won her first professional role in 1995 in an episode of the children's television sitcom The Adventures of Pete & Pete, where she portrayed the love interest of the main character, Big Pete.
In 1996, she landed her first feature film role in The Broccoli Theory, an "unromantic comedy" set in NYC. In 1997, she made her first appearance in a mainstream feature film, the Kevin Kline comedy In & Out. She auditioned six times for the role and remained on-set for several weeks, but most of her scenes were cut from the film's final version. She obtained her first lead role in a feature film in the teen drama Strong Island Boys, based on true events about a Long Island '80s street gang. Actor Alec Baldwin called Blair "a cross between Debra Winger and Marlene Dietrich".

Later, she was selected for the lead in the fantasy film Amazon High, co-starring with Karl Urban. She played a present-day orphaned high school student who accidentally travels back in time to the mythical days of the Amazons. The film, which also was proposed as a third show set in the Hercules and Xena mythological genre, has never been aired. Portions of the pilot were later adapted and edited into the Xena: Warrior Princess episode "Lifeblood" in 2000.
The same year, Blair was cast as Joey Potter on Dawson's Creek, but was later replaced by Katie Holmes. Soon afterward, she auditioned for the title role in Buffy the Vampire Slayer, but Sarah Michelle Gellar was chosen. Blair starred opposite Suzanne Somers in the family drama No Laughing Matter as a pregnant teenager. She subsequently appeared in several independent  and short productions, including Debutante, opposite Josh Hartnett, which was shot in NYC and won multiple awards after its premiere in September 1998.

In 1998, Blair starred opposite Dominique Swain in the teen drama Girl; and in the suspense thriller Brown's Requiem, based on the crime novel of that name.
That year, she also appeared in My Friend Steve's music video for the song "Charmed" (which was also the opening theme for the first season of Zoe, Duncan, Jack and Jane in 1999); and in the music video for the single "Every You Every Me" by the British alternative rock band Placebo, which was featured on the Cruel Intentions soundtrack.

1999–2004: Breakthrough and mainstream success
Following several auditions, independent film roles, and guest roles in television series, Blair achieved her breakthrough opposite Sarah Michelle Gellar and Ryan Phillippe in the 1999 coming-of-age drama Cruel Intentions, loosely based on the 18th-century novel Les Liaisons dangereuses. It received mixed reviews, with Variety finding "newcomer" Blair " too broad" and "overdoing [her role]'s clumsiness". Nevertheless, the film made an impressive US$75.9 million internationally, and brought Blair an MTV Movie Award nomination for "Best Breakthrough Performance" and a win for "Best Kiss", shared with Gellar. Cruel Intentions has since developed a cult following.

Blair went on to star as Zoe Bean on Zoe, Duncan, Jack and Jane, alongside Azura Skye and Michael Rosenbaum. The first season follows the lives of four high school classmates from Manhattan.  The second season was just renamed Zoe..., which follows the title character a few years later as a psychology student; the show was not renewed for a third season.
She was nominated for the Teen Choice Awards for "TV – Breakout Performance" category for her role in Zoe, Duncan, Jack & Jane.

In 2000, Blair won a Movieline's Young Hollywood Award in the "Exciting New Face – Female Category", and portrayed a seductive college student in the teen comedy Down to You, alongside Freddie Prinze, Jr. and Julia Stiles. A lukewarm critical and commercial response greeted the film upon its release.
Her film career continued with the independent drama Kill Me Later opposite Max Beesley. She starred as a suicidal bank teller taken hostage during a bank robbery, who tries to persuade her captors to kill her. The film received a limited release in September 2001, in New York and Los Angeles.

Blair co-starred opposite Reese Witherspoon in the comedy Legally Blonde, portraying a preppy, snobby law student and the "rival" for the affections of Witherspoon's ex-boyfriend. The Hollywood Reporter found her to be a "strong presence" in her role, "coming on as a bitch initially, then softening into feminine solidarity with [Witherspoon's] heroine". The film was released on July 13, 2001, topping the US box office in its opening weekend; it went on to gross US$96.5 million in North America and a worldwide total of US$141.7 million. She next starred as a college student having an affair with her professor in the controversial independent drama Storytelling, alongside Leo Fitzpatrick. It premiered at the 2001 Cannes Film Festival, and received a limited release in most international markets. SPLICEDwire remarked in its review for the film that both Blair and Fitzpatrick gave "painfully authentic performances as an emotionally insecure coed and her cerebral palsy-stricken dorm neighbor and lover".

She starred with Jared Leto and Jake Gyllenhaal in the crime drama Highway, which was released directly to-DVD in March 2002. The independent film, filmed in locations of Seattle, is set in the mid-'90s grunge music scene and follows a road trip to the 1994 Kurt Cobain vigil. Blair next appeared opposite Cameron Diaz and Christina Applegate in the comedy The Sweetest Thing, as the roommate of Diaz's character. While the film received mixed reviews, it grossed US$68.6 million worldwide. For her part, she was nominated for the Teen Choice Awards, in the "Best Actress in a Comedy" category.

In 2002, Blair appeared on the cover of Rolling Stone, and in a television commercial for The Sims Online video game. She also had a guest role in the episode "The One with Christmas in Tulsa" on the hit sitcom Friends. In 2003, Blair co-starred with Jason Lee in the romantic comedy A Guy Thing, playing the fiancé of a man who wakes up after his bachelor party in bed with another woman (played by Julia Stiles). The film received negative reviews and made a lackluster US$15.5 million at the North American box office.

She filmed supporting parts for the independent road film Dallas 362 (2003) and the well-received comedy-drama In Good Company (2004), and appeared alongside former NBA star John Salley and Judy Davis in the television movie Coast to Coast. In 2004, Blair took on the role of Liz Sherman, a depressed pyrokinetic superhero, in Guillermo del Toro's blockbuster fantasy film Hellboy, co-starring Ron Perlman. Based on Mike Mignola's popular comic book series, the film was favorably received by critics; The New York Times remarked: "Blair's heavy-lidded eyes seem to be at half mast from some lovely lewd fantasy. With her sleepy carnality and dry, hesitant timing, she is a superb foil for Mr. Perlman's plain-spoken bravado." Hellboy topped the box office in the U.S. and Canada in its opening weekend, and ultimately grossed US$99.3 million around the globe.

Also in 2004, Blair played the role of an exhibitionist dancer in John Waters' satirical sex comedy A Dirty Shame, alongside Tracey Ullman. The film received a limited theatrical run in North America, garnering an overall mixed response; A.V. Club described the production as a "proud retreat back into the sandbox of sexual juvenilia" and a "potty-mouthed manifesto from an elder statesman of shock", while positively pointing out that both Blair and Ullman "throw themselves headfirst into the insanity, reveling in the forfeiture of dignity, self-respect, and self-consciousness their roles demand". Blair took part on the social project The 1 Second Film as a producer, and was included on the FHM list of "The 100 Sexiest Women of 2004".

2005–2011: Independent films and The Diary of Anne Frank
Blair starred as a young Harvard-trained economist involved in an international oil scandal in the political thriller The Deal (2005), opposite Christian Slater and Angie Harmon. It received limited release in the United States and the United Arab Emirates. She next played supporting role in the independent black comedy Pretty Persuasion (2005), starring Evan Rachel Wood. Her last film release in 2005 was the John Carpenter-produced remake The Fog, in which she did her own stunts, and spent 12 hours in a water tank over two days to shoot her underwater scenes. The film, co-starring Tom Welling and Maggie Grace, met with overwhelmingly negative reviews, and grossed a modest US$46.2 million worldwide. Blair also starred with Elias Koteas in the fantasy short film The Big Empty, based on the story The Specialist and produced by George Clooney. It revolved around a young woman with a psychosomatic medical condition.

Blair starred in the dysfunctional family drama The Night of the White Pants, with Nick Stahl. The film premiered through a limited theatrical run in NYC in 2006. She also appeared in a small role in the comedy-drama The Alibi (2006). In 2007, Blair took on the lead role in Edward Burns' Purple Violets, a romantic comedy co-starring Burns, Patrick Wilson and Debra Messing. In the film, Blair played a frustrated and lonely writer who falls in love with her childhood sweetheart. It premiered at the Tribeca Film Festival and was the first feature film to debut exclusively on the iTunes Store.

She co-starred in Robert Benton's romantic dramedy Feast of Love (2007), opposite Greg Kinnear and Morgan Freeman, portraying a woman who begins a lesbian relationship due to her marital frustrations. The film received mixed critical reviews upon its limited theatrical premiere in North America.
She next appeared in the British crime thriller WΔZ (2007), opposite Stellan Skarsgård, Melissa George and Tom Hardy. Blair starred as a lab assistant who is sexually assaulted by a criminal gang, and becomes a serial killer after watching her mother's death. The film had a limited theatrical run, but was favorably 
by critics.

Blair was included in the list of People Magazine's "World's Most Beautiful People 2007".
In 2008, she reprised her role of Liz Sherman in Hellboy II: The Golden Army, where her character has a larger role in the storyline than its predecessor. The film garnered largely positive reviews from critics and became a worldwide commercial success, grossing US$160 million. She was nominated for the Scream Awards for Best Actress in a Fantasy Movie or TV Show.

In 2008, Blair starred as a drug-addicted and alcoholic mother in Lori Petty's independent drama The Poker House, opposite Jennifer Lawrence (in her breakthrough role) and Chloë Grace Moretz, who starred as her daughters. The film is set in 1976 and was based on Petty's real story, in which she and her two little sisters were abused by their mother and a violent pimp. The production initially had a 2008 limited release in theaters only, but was later re-released in 2015 in the UK as Behind Closed Doors; it received generally favorable reviews from critics, with The Hollywood Reporter considering her performance one of the best of her film career. Blair worked with Antonio Banderas and Meg Ryan in the comedy My Mom's New Boyfriend (2008), where she played a young FBI agent. The movie was screened only in Latin American cinemas and went straight-to-DVD in Anglo America.

Blair accepted the titular role on the NBC sitcom Kath & Kim, opposite Molly Shannon. The sitcom was based on the Australian television series of the same name about a mother and daughter who are obsessed with celebrity culture. Blair had to gain weight and use hair extensions to play her role as Kim, a self-absorbed suburban young princess who is forced to reassess her relationship with her mother. The series was canceled after one season. Blair also appeared with Rainn Wilson singing "Baby, It's Cold Outside" for the 2008 Gap winter ad campaign, and was included in Glamour's list of the 50 Most Glamorous Women of 2008.

In 2009, Blair returned to the stage, when she took on the lead role of Kayleen in Rajiv Joseph's Gruesome Playground Injuries, opposite stage actor Brad Fleischer. The drama made its world premiere at Houston's Alley Theatre on October 16, 2009, to largely positive reviews. In 2010, Blair lent her voice to narrate The Diary of a Young Girl: The Definitive Edition, originally written by Holocaust victim Anne Frank. The audiobook received generally positive reviews from critics and readers. Her performance received a 2011 Grammy Award for Best Spoken Word Album for Children nomination.

Blair starred in the music video for Danko Jones' "Full of Regret"; the video also featured Elijah Wood and Lemmy Kilmister. She next had a guest role in three episodes of the online series Web Therapy starring Lisa Kudrow, and appeared as a guest judge in Heidi Klum's fashion reality show Project Runway. She appeared in a supporting role as a lesbian teacher in the small-scale black comedy The Family Tree (2011), with Madeline Zima, and starred in the psychological thriller Columbus Circle, with Amy Smart and Giovanni Ribisi, playing an agoraphobic heiress who has to face her fears after she killed a man in her apartment. Filming for Columbus Circle took place in 2009, but the movie received a straight-to-DVD release in March 2012.

In 2011, Blair appeared as guest-star in the Portlandia episode "Blunderbuss", appeared in Animal Love, a short college film about life in the post global warming world premiered at the Los Angeles Film Festival, and also starred in the comedic short film The Break-In, directed by Jaime King. In the independent comedy-drama Dark Horse (2011), Blair starred with Christopher Walken, Mia Farrow and Jordan Gelber, reprising her role of Storytelling (2001), who has become an "overmedicated depressive" woman. Dark Horse received a limited theatrical release and garnered a positive response from critics. A.V. Club felt that "the scenes between Gelber and Blair are the strongest in [in the film], because they form a bond not out of shared interests or passion, but a weary kind of compromise".

2012–present: film and television
In 2012, Blair starred in the short film Slideshow of Wieners: A Love Story, a satirical love story about the Internet. Shortly after, she returned to the small screen as the female lead with the premiere of FX's Anger Management co-starring Charlie Sheen. She starred in 53 episodes as Dr. Kate Wales, Sheen's neurotic therapist and love interest.
The series premiered to mixed critical reviews, but broke ratings records with 5.74 million viewers in its debut and ranks as the most-watched sitcom premiere in cable history. Blair left the show in June 2013, during the shooting of the second season due to disagreements with Sheen.

In 2012, Blair narrated Xfinity TV commercials, including the London 2012 Olympics ads, and reprised her role as a woman who pretends she is pregnant in two episodes of the reformatted television version of Web Therapy. She starred opposite Rachel Miner and James D'Arcy in the thriller In Their Skin (2012), about a woman and her family who suffer a brutal home invasion by their psychopathic neighbors after the death of their daughter. It received a mixed critical response after its world premiere at the Tribeca Film Festival, and had a limited theatrical release in North America.

In 2013, Blair was the voice of Destiny in the IFC's animated series Out There. She also had a guest role on the season two of the TV series Comedy Bang! Bang!. In August 2014, she obtained her first small-screen role since she left Anger Management when she was cast as Joanna in the Amazon's comedy pilot Really alongside Sarah Chalke. The comedy, about the complicated life of a group of friends in their 30s is, as of May 2015, available only in the US and the UK.

Blair starred in the drama Sex, Death And Bowling (2015), alongside Adrian Grenier and Bailey Chase. The film is about the marriage of an American soldier who fought in the American invasion in Iraq and who has terminal pancreatic cancer. The film began shooting in October 2013, and was released in selected American theaters in October 2015. Blair also starred with Green Day punk rock frontman Billie Joe Armstrong in the musical drama Ordinary World (2016), as the hard-working lawyer wife of Armstrong's aging rock star character. The production premiered at the Tribeca Film Festival in April 2016.

In February 2016, Blair returned to television in the FX miniseries American Crime Story: The People vs. O. J. Simpson, where she appeared with Cuba Gooding Jr., John Travolta, and David Schwimmer, portraying Kris Jenner, the former wife of Simpson's attorney Robert Kardashian. The project recreated the 1995 publicized O. J. Simpson murder case, and aired to critical and popular acclaim. Also in 2016, Blair starred as a "single, unfulfilled rock photographer" in the independent drama Mothers and Daughters, as part of a large ensemble cast, consisting of Susan Sarandon, Sharon Stone, Mira Sorvino and Courteney Cox. The film was released on 6 May 2016 for digital markets and received largely mixed reviews. The Hollywood Reporter found the "talented actresses" involved to be "hamstrung" by the film's "unsubtle script that piles on far too many melodramatic plot contrivances for a 90-minute [production]", and remarked that while Blair's "voiceover narration promises to be a connective thread, [her] device is quickly abandoned, with the profusion of barely interconnected characters".

In June 2016, Blair was cast alongside Nicolas Cage and Anne Winters in Brian Taylor's horror comedy film, Mom and Dad, which was released in theaters on January 19, 2018. The film received positive reviews from critics.

On August 21, 2018, it was announced that Blair was cast in a recurring role on the Netflix science-fiction drama series, Another Life. It ran for two seasons from 2019 to 2021 before being canceled.

On September 8, 2022, Blair was announced as a contestant on season 31 of Dancing with the Stars. She was partnered with Sasha Farber. In the fifth week of the competition, at the advice of her doctors, Blair departed the competition because of her deteriorating health.

Fashion

During the early 2000s, Blair appeared twice on the cover of the Vanity Fair Hollywood Issue;  as one of "Hollywood's Next Wave of Stars." In early 2002, she appeared in a Pirelli Calendar alongside Rachael Leigh Cook.

Blair is known to follow new style and fashion trends in addition to her radical hairstyle changes, lending her image to the Marc Jacobs-Brian Bowen Smith clothing line. She has worked with other fashion designers, including Karen Zambos, Martin Margiela, Isaac Mizrahi, Reinaldo Herrera, and Stella McCartney. She has been a frequent guest at New York Fashion Week, and other fashion events.

On October 30, 2005, she appeared in The New York Times Magazine award-winning photography gallery, "The Selma Blair Witch Project: Fall’s Dark Silhouettes Have a Way of Creeping Up on You" by the art photographer Roger Ballen, at the Palau Robert in Barcelona in 2012.

In 2010, Blair posed with Demi Moore and Amanda De Cadenet for a spread in Harper's Bazaar magazine. In 2012, she became the spokesperson for, and first actress to appear on, the "Get Real For Kids" campaign. In the spring of that year, she released SB, a line of handbags and wallets which she designed.
She has appeared on the covers and photo sessions of other magazines. In 1999, she appeared in Seventeen, and in subsequent years, in magazines including Vanity Fair, Marie Claire, Vogue, Glamour, Rolling Stone, The Lab Magazine, Interview, Dazed & Confused, Hunger, and Elle. She has been the face of fashion houses Chanel, Miu Miu and GAP.

In February 2016, Blair appeared on the cover of CR Fashion Book magazine.

In February 2018, she presented parts of the collection of Christian Siriano celebrating his 10th stage anniversary in Masonic Hall during New York Fashion Week 2018.

Personal life

Relationships and family
In 1990, Blair's childhood sweetheart died in an accident at the age of 18. Recalling the event, she said, "It made me realize I have to live. Having the boy I loved not anymore on this planet, I'd better live, I'd better do something."

On January 24, 2004, after six months of dating, Blair married writer and producer Ahmet Zappa (son of musician Frank Zappa) at Carrie Fisher's mansion in Beverly Hills, California. They lived in Los Angeles in a 1920s-era home they bought for $1.35 million in 2004. She filed for divorce from Zappa on June 21, 2006, citing "irreconcilable differences." In a statement to People magazine, a spokesperson for the couple said, "Selma and Ahmet have decided to divorce, but love each other very much and will continue to be close friends." The divorce became final in December 2006.

Blair dated her Kath and Kim co-star Mikey Day from 2008 to 2010.

In 2010, Blair began dating fashion designer Jason Bleick. In January 2011, her representative announced that she was pregnant with her first child, and their son was born that July. In September 2012, they announced that they had separated after two years.

Health

In October 2018, Blair revealed that she had been diagnosed with multiple sclerosis in August of that year. For years she had thought that she was suffering from minor illnesses, or even a pinched nerve, but the diagnosis finally explained her disabilities, including her occasional falling, dropping things, foggy memory, and her left side "acting like it was asking for directions from a broken GPS." She was inspired to reveal the news as a way to thank Allisa Swanson, her costume designer, who had become her unofficial "dresser" for her role in the Netflix series Another Life, saying that Swanson "gets my legs in my pants, pulls my tops over my head, (and) buttons my coats." Blair wrote about her experiences with multiple sclerosis in her memoir, Mean Baby: A Memoir of Growing Up, which was published in May 2022.

Advocacy

On May 27, 2012, Blair was a special guest at the National Memorial Day Concert at the U.S. Capitol in Washington, DC. She presented the story of Brigette Cain, a war widow who lost her husband (Pfc. Norman L. Cain III) in Afghanistan.

In October 2012, Blair starred in the political satire sketch The Woman for Romney, about the campaign proposals of Mitt Romney, former Republican Party nominee for the 2012 United States presidential election. She also supported Marianne Williamson for the 2014 congressional elections.

Blair enjoys child and animal care. She has practiced horseback riding since age 17. Wink, her dog since early in her acting career, died in February 2011. She collects black-and-white photographs and practices ice skating.

Blair's charity work and philanthropic causes include Marc Jacobs' Skin Cancer Awareness Campaign, H&M's Fashion Against AIDS 2011 Campaign, Children's Action Network, AmFAR AIDS Research 2011, Lange Foundation (dedicated to saving homeless and abandoned animals), Bulgari-Save the Children 2012 Ad Campaign, No Kid Hungry, Staying Alive Foundation and the National Multiple Sclerosis Society. On October 2, 2015, she received the Universal Smile Award during THE SMILE GALA LA 2015 to benefit children with cleft lip and palate. She was included as one of the Silence Breakers selected as the 2017 Time Person of the Year. In December 2021, Michelle Pfeiffer presented Blair with the Equity in Entertainment Award at the Power 100 Women ceremony. In December 2022 she was chosen as one of the BBC's 100 women.

Filmography

Film

Television

Theatre

Music videos

Video games

Audiobooks

Awards and nominations

References

External links

 Selma Blair Net Worth: How Much Money Does She Have?

 
 
 Selma Blair Producer Profile for The 1 Second Film

1972 births
Actresses from Detroit
American film actresses
American television actresses
Cranbrook Educational Community alumni
Jewish American actresses
Kalamazoo College alumni
Living people
New York University alumni
People from Southfield, Michigan
People with multiple sclerosis
University of Michigan alumni
20th-century American actresses
21st-century American actresses
21st-century American Jews
BBC 100 Women